Vila Halafihi (born 24 January 1994) is an English professional rugby league footballer who plays as a  for Sheffield Eagles in the RFL Championship.

He is the son of former Hull KR, Sheffield Eagles and London Crusaders forward Nick Halafihi.

Halafihi was a product of the Leeds academy system.

Playing career

Bradford Bulls
2015 - 2015 Season

Halafihi signed for Championship side Bradford on a one-year deal. He featured in the pre-season friendlies against Castleford and Leeds.

He featured in Round 8 (Dewsbury) then in Round 10 (Doncaster). He played in Round 19 (Batley) to Round 20 (Hunslet). Halafihi played in Round 23 (Halifax) then in Qualifier 7 (Halifax).

He signed a two-year extension to his contract at the end of the season.

2016 - 2016 Season

Halafihi played in the pre-season friendlies against Leeds and Castleford.

2017 - 2017 Season

Halafihi re-signed with the Bradford club following the clubs liquidation at the end of the 2016 season.

He featured in the pre-season friendlies against Huddersfield and Keighley.

Halafihi played in Round 3 (Swinton Lions) then in Round 7 (Dewsbury) to Round 8 (Oldham). He also featured in Round 11 (Featherstone Rovers) and Round 14 (London Broncos) then in Round 16 (Dewsbury) to Round 17 (Featherstone Rovers). He featured in Round 20 (Halifax). Halafihi played in the Championship Shield Game 1 (Toulouse Olympique) to Game 7 (Rochdale Hornets). He also played in the 2017 Challenge Cup in Round 4 (Featherstone Rovers).

He signed a two-year contract extension at the end of the season.

2018 - 2018 Season

Halafihi featured in the pre-season friendlies against Halifax, Sheffield Eagles, Dewsbury, Toronto Wolfpack and Keighley.

He featured in Round 1 (York City Knights) to Round 2 (London Skolars) then in Round 7 (Coventry Bears). He also played in Round 9 (West Wales Raiders) to Round 16 (Newcastle Thunder) then in Round 19 (London Skolars) to Round 20 (Whitehaven R.L.F.C.). Vila played in Round 26 (Hemel Stags). Halafihi played in the 2018 Challenge Cup in Round 3 (West Wales Raiders) to Round 5 (Warrington). He scored against West Wales Raiders (1 try), Hemel Stags (1 try), Whitehaven R.L.F.C. (1 try) and London Skolars (1 try).

Hunslet RLFC
On 2 November 2018, it was reported that Halafihi had joined Hunslet RLFC.

Sheffield Eagles
In October 2021, Halafihi joined Sheffield Eagles on a two-year deal.

Statistics
Statistics do not include pre-season friendlies.

References

External links
Bradford Bulls profile
Bulls profile

1994 births
Living people
Bradford Bulls players
English rugby league players
Hunslet R.L.F.C. players
Leeds Rhinos players
Oxford Rugby League players
Rugby league players from Leeds
Rugby league hookers
Sheffield Eagles players
Swinton Lions players